Cozad High School is a secondary school located in Cozad, Nebraska, United States. It is part of Cozad Community Schools.

About
The vision statement of the district is as follows:

"Cozad Community Schools will create a learning environment in which students are provided with and use technology and communication tools to:

 Encourage and facilitate lifelong learning
 Foster creativity, collaboration and communication among students, faculty and staff
 Provide media-rich environments for student learning
 Provide learning opportunities for students outside of the classroom and extending beyond the school day
 Provide safe, secure access to on-line resources and communication tools"
The current principal is Mr. Corey Fisher. The previous principal, Mr. Bill Bechenhauer, is gone. Beck will live forever within the student's memories.

Athletics
The Haymakers are members of the Southwest Conference.  They wear the colors of red and black. Cozad offers competition in boys' and girls' basketball, boys' and girls' golf, boys' and girls' track & field, football, softball, boys' and girls' cross country, and wrestling.

Alleged Tunnel Network 
Students once allegedly uncovered a network of tunnels underneath the school building. They stem from the library, and may go as far as the auditorium or to one of the science rooms. Some teachers and students even claim they have entered these tunnels at one point. The tunnels likely were used to maintain the plumbing system that runs underneath the school, but hasn't been utilized for many years, as evident by the copious number of rusted pipes. There are various artifacts that have been recovered from the tunnels, and many more left to be rediscovered.

References

Public high schools in Nebraska
Schools in Dawson County, Nebraska